Syarhey Maryanavich Lagutko (born 23 May 1970) is a former Belarusian football player.

He also played futsal professionally, winning many Belarus trophies and titles in that sport.

External links
 

1970 births
Footballers from Minsk
Living people
Belarusian footballers
FC Orsha players
Belarusian expatriate footballers
Expatriate footballers in Russia
PFC Krylia Sovetov Samara players
Russian Premier League players
FC BATE Borisov players
FC Neman Grodno players
FC Darida Minsk Raion players
FC Rudziensk players
FC Veras Nesvizh players
Belarusian men's futsal players
Association football midfielders